La vida por delante is a 1958 Spanish comedy film starring and written and directed by Fernando Fernán Gómez. The film enjoyed enough success to inspire a sequel, La vida alrededor, released in 1959.

Life ahead narrates the misadventures of a newlywed couple, the lawyer Antonio Redondo (Fernando) and the doctor Josefina Castro (played by Fernán Gómez's partner at the time, the Hispanic-Argentine Analía Gadé) with their different avatars. Family, work and conjugal, especially with those insurmountable barriers that must be overcome in order to acquire a decent home. It emerges as an acid and gray portrait of the Spain of the fifties, explaining the miseries and hardships that squeezed the desire for prosperity and freedom of a youth that lived in a constant unreality, tortured by the lack of autonomy, hopes and expectations. Within an opaque, gloomy and gloomy nation that left no room for genius or debate.

References

External links

1958 films
1958 comedy films
Films directed by Fernando Fernán Gómez
Spanish comedy films
1950s Spanish-language films
Spanish black-and-white films
Madrid in fiction
Spain in fiction
1950s Spanish films